OVH, legally OVH Groupe SAS, is a French cloud computing company which offers VPS, dedicated servers and other web services. As of 2016 OVH owned the world's largest data center in surface area. As of 2019, it was the largest hosting provider in Europe, and the third largest in the world based on physical servers. The company was founded in 1999 by the Klaba family and is headquartered in Roubaix, France. OVH is incorporated as a simplified joint-stock company under French law. In 2019 OVH adopted OVHcloud as its public brand name.

History and growth 
OVH was founded in November 1999 by Octave Klaba, with the help of three family members (Henry, Haline, and Miroslaw).

Funding
In October 2016, OVH raised $250 million in order to raise further international expansion. This funding round valued OVH at over US$1 billion. In the fiscal year of 2016, OVH reportedly had around $343 million in revenue. In 2018 OVH announced its five-year plans to triple investment starting in 2021. Which represent between 4.6 and $8.1 billion U.S. dollars (4 to 7 billion euros).

In October 2021, OVHcloud filed its IPO and is listed on the Euronext Paris, the Paris Stock Exchange as OVH. In December 2021, OVHcloud became part of the Paris SBF120 index.

Operations
As of 2021, OVH had 32 data centers in 19 countries hosting 300,000 servers. The company offers localized services such as customer service offices in many European countries, as well as in North America, Africa, and Singapore. , OVH is considered one of the largest cloud computing providers in the world, with over a million customers and one of the largest OpenStack deployments in the world, and a network capacity totaling over 20Tbps

As of 2017, OVH was known for its offering of email hosting service, considered one of the largest in the world, in addition to its general Internet hosting services.

OVH uses in-house design and manufacturing, including custom-made servers (based on standard components) and a modular shipping container architecture. In 2019, the Canadian data center (Beauharnois, Quebec) was considered a leading example of the OVH model.

Partnerships
As of 2016, OVH was one of the sponsors for Let's Encrypt, a free TLS encryption service, and OVH's hardware supplier is Super Micro Computer Inc.

Incidents
In March 2021, OVH suffered a large fire at its datacenter in Strasbourg, France. SBG2 had been built in 2016 with a capacity of 30 thousand physical servers. SBG2 was declared a total loss, with early reports indicating damage to SBG1, and services across all four Strasbourg locations experiencing disruptions. The company's chairman, Octave Klaba, took to Twitter to confirm that all its staff were safe. SBG1 was damaged partially while SBG4 remained intact, and SBG3 was intact but without power, though the servers at the latter sites were taken offline temporarily.

In September 2021, the company filed a report with the Autorité des marchés financiers documenting the estimated damage at about €105 million.

In October 2021, the company had a worldwide outage across all their networks due to a human error.

Controversies

WikiLeaks
In December 2010, French Gizmodo edition revealed that WikiLeaks selected OVH as its new hosting provider, following Amazon's refusal to host it. On December 3, the growing controversy prompted Eric Besson, France's Industry Minister, to inquire about legal ways to prohibit this hosting in France. The attempt failed. On December 6, 2010, a judge ruled that there was no need for OVH to cease hosting WikiLeaks. The case was rejected on the grounds that such a case required an adversarial hearing.

Information disclosure and multiple vulnerabilities 
In January 2019, the magazine WebsitePlanet uncovered client-side vulnerability in some of the largest hosting companies in the world: Bluehost, DreamHost, HostGator, iPage and OVH.

Environmental impact 

OVH started to integrate innovative water cooling in 2003 in its datacenters.

OVH relies in large part on nuclear power, in particular their Gravelines data centre is known for being located next to the Gravelines Nuclear Power Station.

In January 2021, OVH with other industry players joined the Climate Neutral Data Centre Pact, which is a pledge to achieve climate neutrality of datacenters before 2030.

References

External links 
 

Telecommunications companies established in 1999
French companies established in 1999
Internet technology companies of France
French brands
Web service providers
Web hosting
File hosting
Cloud computing providers
Data centers
Networking hardware companies
Commercial building fires